Spencer House is a historic home located at Lima in Livingston County, New York. It is believed to date to the 1830s, enlarged in the 1850s and 1860s.  It is a two-story, L-shaped frame building with clapboard siding, a cobblestone foundation, and low-pitched gable roofs.  The main block evinces the persistence of Federal period architectural traditions with the two-story, three-bay, side-hall form, delicate louvered fan in the front gable, and slender frieze and corner boards. Also on the property is a contributing 19th century carriage house.

It was listed on the National Register of Historic Places in 1989.

References

Houses on the National Register of Historic Places in New York (state)
Federal architecture in New York (state)
Houses in Livingston County, New York
National Register of Historic Places in Livingston County, New York